Central Cimahi is a district of Cimahi, West Java, Indonesia. Central Cimahi had a population of 163,961 in 2014.

Villages 
Central Cimahi is divided into six villages:

References 

Districts of Cimahi